Ismene narcissiflora is a plant species in the family Amaryllidaceae. It is native to Peru and Bolivia.

References 

Flora of Peru
Amaryllidoideae